Tricholochmaea decora, known generally as the Pacific willow leaf beetle or gray willow leaf beetle, is a species of skeletonizing leaf beetle in the family Chrysomelidae. It is found in North America.

Subspecies
 Tricholochmaea decora carbo (J. L. LeConte, 1861)
 Tricholochmaea decora decora (Say, 1824)

References

Further reading

 
 

Galerucinae
Beetles described in 1824
Taxa named by Thomas Say